The Sonata in A major for Violin and Piano by César Franck is one of his best-known compositions, and is considered one of the finest sonatas for violin and piano ever written. It is an amalgam of his rich native harmonic language with the Classical traditions he valued highly, held together in a cyclic framework.

Background
The Violin Sonata in A was written in 1886, when César Franck was 63, as a wedding present for the 28-year-old violinist Eugène Ysaÿe. Twenty-eight years earlier, in 1858, Franck had promised a violin sonata for Cosima von Bülow. This never appeared; it has been speculated that whatever work Franck had done on that piece was put aside, and eventually ended up in the sonata he wrote for Ysaÿe in 1886.

Franck was not present when Ysaÿe married, but on the morning of the wedding, on 26 September 1886 in Arlon, their mutual friend Charles Bordes presented the work as Franck's gift to Ysaÿe and his bride Louise Bourdeau de Courtrai. After a hurried rehearsal, Ysaÿe and Bordes' sister-in-law, the pianist Marie-Léontine Bordes-Pène, played the Sonata to the other wedding guests.

The Sonata was given its first public concert performance on 16 December of that year, at the Musée Moderne de Peinture (Museum of Modern Painting) in Brussels. Ysaÿe and Bordes-Pène were again the performers. The Sonata was the final item in a long program which started at 3pm. When the time arrived for the Sonata, dusk had fallen and the gallery was bathed in gloom, but the museum authorities permitted no artificial light whatsoever. Initially, it seemed the Sonata would have to be abandoned, but Ysaÿe and Bordes-Pène decided to continue regardless. They had to play the last three movements from memory in virtual darkness. When the violinist Armand Parent remarked that Ysaÿe had played the first movement faster than the composer intended, Franck replied that Ysaÿe had made the right decision, saying "from now on there will be no other way to play it". Vincent d'Indy, who was present, recorded these details of the event.

Ysaÿe kept the Violin Sonata in his repertoire for the next 40 years of his life, with a variety of pianists, like Théo Ysaÿe, Ernest Chausson, Ferruccio Busoni, Vincent d'Indy, Raoul Pugno, Camille Decreus, Arthur De Greef, Leopold Godowsky, Yves Nat, and many others. His championing of the Sonata contributed to the public recognition of Franck as a major composer. This recognition was quite belated; Franck died within four years of the Sonata's public première, and did not have his first unqualified public success until the last year of his life (on 19 April 1890, at the Salle Pleyel, where his String Quartet in D was premiered).

The Sonata in A regularly appears on concert programs and on recordings, and is in the core repertoire of all major violinists. Jascha Heifetz played it at his final recital in 1972.

The piece is further notable for the difficulty of its piano part, when compared with most of the chamber repertoire. Its technical problems include frequent extreme extended figures—the composer himself having possessed huge hands—and virtuoso runs and leaps, particularly in the second movement (though some passages can be facilitated by employing a spare hand to cover some notes).

Structure

The work is cyclic in nature, all the movements sharing common thematic threads. Themes from one movement reappear in subsequent movements, but usually transformed. Franck had adapted this technique from Franz Liszt—his friend, and Cosima von Bülow's father. Vincent d'Indy described the Sonata as "the first and purest model of the cyclical use of themes in sonata form", and referred to it as "this true musical monument".

The movements alternate between slow and fast.

Transcriptions

Jean-Pierre Rampal made a transcription for flute and piano that is still performed frequently. The Violin Sonata in A also exists in versions for cello; viola; double bass; oboe; clarinet; alto saxophone; tuba; organ with choir; violin and strings; and violin and orchestra (recorded by Leonid Kogan). A version for piano duet by the pianist and composer Alfred Cortot has been recorded several times. Cortot also made a (for pianists even more challenging) version for solo piano, which has been played occasionally.

The setting for cello and piano was the only alternative version sanctioned by Franck. This was created by the renowned cellist Jules Delsart. After thorough historical study based on reliable documents, Delsart's transcription for cello (the piano part remains the same as in the violin sonata) was published by G. Henle Verlag as an Urtext edition. Based on oral history (Pablo Casals) and written document (letter written by Antoine Ysaye, Eugène Ysaÿe's son), it has often been speculated that the work was first conceived as a sonata for cello and piano, and only later reset for violin and piano when the commission from Eugène Ysaÿe arrived.

Recordings
The Violin Sonata in A by César Franck has been recorded by many great violinist/pianist duos. Among them are:
 Joshua Bell with Jean-Yves Thibaudet
 Renaud Capuçon with Lilya Zilberstein
 Kyung-wha Chung with Radu Lupu
 Kaja Danczowska with Krystian Zimerman
 Isabelle Faust with Alexander Melnikov
 Christian Ferras with Pierre Barbizet
 Zino Francescatti with Robert Casadesus
 Erick Friedman with André Previn
 Ivry Gitlis with Martha Argerich
 Arthur Grumiaux (multiple recordings)
 Jascha Heifetz with Arthur Rubinstein and with Brooks Smith
 Alina Ibragimova with Cédric Tiberghien
 Sergey Khachatryan with Luisine Khachatryan
 Shlomo Mintz with Yefim Bronfman
 Anne-Sophie Mutter with Alexis Weissenberg (1983) and with Lambert Orkis (1996);
 Takako Nishizaki with Jenő Jandó
 David Oistrakh with Lev Oborin, also with Sviatoslav Richter, and with Vladimir Yampolsky
 Elmar Oliveira with Jonathan Feldman
 Itzhak Perlman with Martha Argerich and with Vladimir Ashkenazy
 Ossy Renardy with Eugene List
 Vadim Repin with Nikolai Lugansky
 Aaron Rosand with Seymour Lipkin
 Gil Shaham with Gerhard Oppitz
 Isaac Stern with Alexander Zakin
 Josef Suk with Jan Panenka
 Henryk Szeryng with Mindru Katz
 Gerhard Taschner with Walter Gieseking
 Jacques Thibaud with Alfred Cortot

Violist Tabea Zimmermann released a recording of it arranged for viola and piano with pianist Kirill Gerstein.

Among the recordings of the version for cello and piano are:
Jacqueline du Pré with Daniel Barenboim (du Pré's last recording)
 Ofra Harnoy with Cyprien Katsaris
 Steven Isserlis with Pascal Devoyon
 Yo-Yo Ma and Kathryn Stott
 Mischa Maisky with Martha Argerich
 Leonard Rose with Leonid Hambro

The flute and piano version has been recorded by:
 Jean-Pierre Rampal and Pierre Barbizet
 James Galway and Martha Argerich
 Sharon Bezaly and Vladimir Ashkenazy

Some transcriptions for oboe and clarinet have been made and recorded by David Walter and Michael Collins, respectively.

In 2020, a recording of a version for theremin and piano, played by Clara Rockmore and Nadia Reisenberg, was released as part of the album Music and Memories: Clara Rockmore.

References

External links

Compositions by César Franck
1886 compositions
Franck
Compositions in A major
Music dedicated to ensembles or performers
Music dedicated to family or friends